Tân Thủy may refer to several places in Vietnam:

 , a rural commune of Ba Tri District
 Tân Thủy, Quảng Bình, a rural commune of Lệ Thủy District